Colman O'Shaughnessy, O.P. (died 2 September 1748) was an Irish Roman Catholic clergyman who served as Bishop of Ossory from 1736 until his death in 1748.

He was the eldest son of Cormac, second son of Dermott Ó Seachnasaigh. He was educated at Athenry College, after which he became an army officer. When he left his military career, he joined the Dominican Order. He made his ecclesiastical studies in Louvain, and he completed them before 1706. After serving on the Irish Mission for years, with great zeal and success, he was elected Provincial of the Dominican Order on 30 April 1726. Almost ten years later, he was appointed Bishop of Ossory by a papal brief on 5 October 1736.

When his uncle, William O'Shaughnessy, died in 1744, he became the Chief of the Name and commenced a lawsuit in the Court of Common Pleas to recover the ancient O'Shaughnessy estates at Gort in County Galway, Ireland. The property had been taken from Roger O'Shaughnessy by King William III in 1690, and given to Thomas Prendergast in 1697. Despite a protracted court case, which lasted beyond the life of the bishop, it was finally ruled in favour of the Prendergasts, the penal laws against Catholics tending to defeat the rights of the O'Shaughnessies.

References

 D'Alton, John, Illustrations, Historical and Genealogical, of King James's Irish Army List (1689). Dublin: 1st edition (single volume), 1855. pp. 328–32.
 History of Galway, James Hardiman, 1820.
 Tabular pedigrees of O'Shaughnessy of Gort (1543–1783), Martin J. Blake, Journal of the Galway Archaeological and Historical Society, vi (1909–10), p. 64; vii (1911–12), p. 53.
 John O'Donovan. The Genealogies, Tribes, and Customs of Hy-Fiachrach. Dublin: Irish Archaeological Society. 1844. Pedigree of O'Shaughnessy: pp. 372–91.
 Old Galway, Professor Mary Donovan O'Sullivan, 1942.
 Galway: Town and Gown, edited Moran et al., 1984.
 Galway: History and Society, 1996.

1748 deaths
18th-century Irish people
People from County Galway
Roman Catholic bishops of Ossory
Irish Dominicans
Colman
Year of birth unknown